Count Gustaf af Wetterstedt (29 December 1776 – 15 May 1837) was a Swedish statesman. He was the Swedish Minister for Foreign Affairs from 1824 to 1837. In 1811, he was elected into the Swedish Academy, and later he also became a member of the Royal Swedish Academies of Agriculture, Music and Sciences (1817). In 1821, he was elected as a member of the American Philosophical Society in Philadelphia. He was invested Knight of the Order of the Seraphim.

Among the treaties he negotiated and signed on behalf of Sweden were the Treaty of Örebro and the Treaty of Kiel.

References and notes

External links 
Gustaf af Wetterstedt - Svenskt biografiskt handlexikon (in Swedish)

1776 births
1837 deaths
Members of the Swedish Academy
Swedish politicians
19th-century Swedish nobility
Members of the Royal Swedish Academy of Sciences
19th-century Swedish politicians
Swedish-speaking Finns